The Congressional International Religious Freedom (IRF) Caucus is a bi-partisan group of nearly 60 members of the United States Congress who address religious persecution for people of any or no faith based on Article 18 of the United Nations Declaration of Human Rights.  The IRF Caucus has always addressed religious freedom within the broader context of human rights in the spirit of the International Religious Freedom Act of 1998 (IRFA). The Caucus plays a critical role in raising the profile of numerous religious freedom issues in Congress and with both the Bush and Obama Administrations, and led to the release of many individuals imprisoned for their faith and ensures relief for many suffering under religious persecution.

History 
The IRF Caucus was established on the belief that, by ensuring that Congress proactively promotes greater respect for religious freedom in American policy with foreign governments, individuals throughout the world would experience greater freedom and dignity with respect to other rights that closely intertwine with the freedom of religion.  Indeed, states that actively ensure the freedom of religion benefit from greater political stability, economic prosperity, and social harmony, and in turn create greater international peace.

Established in 2006 by bipartisan co-founders Trent Franks, a Republican from Arizona, and Emanuel Cleaver, II, a Democrat from Missouri, the Caucus has worked to ensure that this freedom, which was so foundational to America's democratic history, remains a priority in United States foreign policy, development, and refugee law. With nearly 60 members, the Caucus enjoys broad bipartisan and multi-faith support as it highlights ways to ensure greater respect for an individual's freedom of religious belief throughout the world.  In doing so, the Caucus utilizes international standards as a basis for defining an individual's right to freedom of religious belief, including Article 18 of the Universal Declaration of Human Rights which states:

Everyone has the right to freedom of thought, conscience and religion; this right includes freedom to change his religion or belief, and freedom, either alone or in community with others and in public or private, to manifest his religion or belief in teaching, practice, worship and observance.

The Caucus has been an important vehicle for the coordination of religious freedom advocacy in Congress, enabling Members to learn about and become more involved in engaging on this important issue. Over the coming months, we will continue to coordinate any issues members are interested in by hosting briefings, raising cases, coordinating sign-on letters, and discussing strategies for influencing greater respect for religious freedom in US foreign policy.

In the past, the Caucus has held several public hearings on the religious freedom situation in countries such as Bahrain, Bangladesh, Burma, China, Egypt, India, Iran, Iraq, Kazakhstan, Malaysia, North Korea, Nigeria, Pakistan, Saudi Arabia, Sudan, Turkey, and Vietnam.  In addition, the Caucus has raised dozens of specific cases of persecution in urgent need of attention with foreign governments.  Most recently, the Caucus coordinated efforts to secure the release of individuals imprisoned for their faith or human rights activities, including Sayed Mussa in Afghanistan and Kareem Abdul Soleiman Amer in Egypt, the safety and asylum of persecuted individuals, and the defeat of the "defamation of religions" resolution at the United Nations.

Leadership 
The current co-chairs of the International Religious Freedom Caucus are Gus Bilirakis (Republican) and Dan Lipinski (Democrat)

Members, 112th Congress

References 

Caucuses of the United States Congress
Human rights organizations based in the United States
Organizations established in 2006
Freedom of religion
Religious persecution